Kenan Doğulu (born 31 May 1974) is a Turkish pop musician. He represented Turkey at the Eurovision Song Contest 2007 in Helsinki, where he was placed fourth, with 163 points. In the summer of 2006, Doğulu released the album Festival, containing the hit single "Çakkıdı", in collaboration with Sezen Aksu.

Personal life
His father is musician Yurdaer Doğulu. His brother is  musician Ozan Doğulu. His sister, Canan Doğulu, is a fashion designer. He stated in an interview that "My grandfather is from Antep. My father is from Adanalı. "Doğulu" surname probably came from Israel. In the past, Everyone who came from east is called "Doğulu". My name "Kenan" means Canaan country."   

Kenan Doğulu began dating actress Beren Saat in February 2012. Doğulu and Saat became engaged on 23 February 2014 in Istanbul and were married on 29 July 2014 in a private ceremony in Los Angeles, United States.

Education
At the age of five, joined the piano department of the conservatory with first place. He studied piano for six years, took flute lessons from his teacher Erkan Alpay and guitar lessons from Erdem Sökmen. Meanwhile, he continued his education in theater, soloist in a children's choir, and rhythm instruments.

He completed his high school education at Kültür College. He completed the “Communication” certificate program at Hesser College, New Hampshire, USA. Then, he started study at the L.A. Musicians Institute. He then continued in Turkey, at Istanbul Bilgi University.

Discography

Studio albums

Compilation albums

Remix albums

Split albums

EPs

Singles

Charts

References

External links

 

1974 births
Living people
People from Beyoğlu
Turkish singer-songwriters
Turkish pop singers
Turkish-language singers
Eurovision Song Contest entrants for Turkey
Eurovision Song Contest entrants of 2007
Musicians Institute alumni
21st-century Turkish singers
21st-century Turkish male singers
Istanbul Bilgi University alumni